Eric David Hicks (born June 17, 1976) is a former American football defensive end. He was signed by the Kansas City Chiefs as an undrafted free agent in 1998. He played college football at Maryland.

Hicks was also a member of the New York Jets and the Detroit Lions.

Early years
Hicks attended Mercyhurst Preparatory School in Erie, Pennsylvania from 1991 to 1994 after transferring there before his sophomore year. As a senior, he posted 6.0 sacks, and 68 tackles. He was also named First-team All-Metro. In 2006, he received the Distinguished Alumni Award.

College career
Hicks attended the University of Maryland, College Park, majoring in criminology and criminal justice, where he finished his career with 9.5 sacks, 147 tackles (26 for losses), three forced fumbles, two fumble recoveries, and three pass deflections.

Professional career

Kansas City Chiefs
Hicks was an undrafted free agent in 1998 when he made the Kansas City Chiefs opening day roster, the only rookie free agent to make the club’s opening day roster that year. He started 90 of the 96 games he has played in. He ranks fifth in franchise history with 40.5 career sacks. He recorded a career high 14.0 sacks in just 11 starts during the 2000 campaign, becoming just the fourth Kansas City Chiefs player to ever reach the 14.0-sack mark.  He accumulated four tackles (three solo) in his lone postseason start in 2003. Hicks saw a decline in production in 2006, as he only registered two solo tackles and five assisted tackles in 16 games. He signed to a six-year contract in 2004 but became a salary cap casualty before the 2007 season and was cut in May 2007.

New York Jets
Hicks was signed by the New York Jets for the 2007 season, appearing in 11 games while recording 17 tackles and no sacks. On December 18, 2007, he was released by the Jets.

Detroit Lions
After spending the 2008 season out of football, Hicks was signed by the Detroit Lions on May 4, 2009. He was released on July 30, 2009.

Personal life
Hicks was born to Cheryl Vaughn and Augustas Hicks. He has two sisters and two brothers.

Head coaching record

References

1976 births
Living people
American football defensive ends
Avila Eagles football coaches
Detroit Lions players
Kansas City Chiefs players
Lamar Cardinals football coaches
Maryland Terrapins football players
New York Jets players
Sportspeople from Erie, Pennsylvania
Players of American football from Pennsylvania
Ed Block Courage Award recipients